Hugh Dunlop Brown MA BL, was an author, pastor-teacher of Harcourt Street Baptist Church, was sympathetic to the Irish Unionist Alliance, President of the Irish Baptist Association in 1887 and theologian associated with Charles Spurgeon, Charles's grandson T.H. Spurgeon was appointed Principal of the IBC in 1916.

A graduate of Trinity College, Dublin where he obtained a MA, he later qualified as a barrister.

In 1892 he founded the Irish Baptist Training Institute at 16 Harcourt Street in Dublin, with just five students, beside the Harcourt Street Baptist Church where he preached, which later became the Irish Baptist College, which is now based outside Lisburn.

He wrote a number of books including Irish Baptists on the Home Rule Bill published in 1893 by the Irish Unionist Alliance.

Brown died in Dublin on 24 April 1918, and is buried in Mount Jerome Cemetery, Dublin.

See also 
 Association of Baptist Churches in Ireland
 Irish Baptist Association
 Irish Baptist College

References 

People associated with the Irish Baptist College
Association of Baptist Churches in Ireland church members
Association of Baptist Churches in Ireland pastor-teachers
Irish barristers
Alumni of Trinity College Dublin
Alumni of King's Inns
1918 deaths
Year of birth missing
Burials at Mount Jerome Cemetery and Crematorium